Wu Sha (born 21 October 1985) is a Chinese pole vaulter. Her personal best jump is 4.40 metres, achieved in 2009 in Jinan. She is married to Liu Xiang.

Achievements

After the end of her career, she started dating Liu Xiang.

References

1987 births
Living people
Chinese female pole vaulters